Cover, alternatively the covers, is a region of the field with respect to the batter in cricket.

The location of the cover region depends on a batter's handedness, but it is always a part of the field on the off side in front of the batter, stretching from around slightly forward of square on the off side through an approximately twenty-degree sweep upward across the field. The diagram shows the location of the cover region for a right-handed batter.

The cover drive is considered one of the most graceful shots playable in the sport.

See also
Cricket terminology
Off side
Fielding (cricket)
Batting (cricket)

References

Cricket terminology